

Bassendean (once referred to as West Guildford) is a north-eastern suburb of Perth, Western Australia. Its local government area is the Town of Bassendean.

It is also the name of the sand dune system on the Swan Coastal Plain known as the Bassendean Dune System.

History
In 1829, the land along the Swan River was allotted to British settlers as they arrived in the newly created Swan River Colony. James Henty and his brothers were granted 2,000 acres upon which they grazed their livestock and built a mud-brick homestead. They called their property Stoke Farm. In 1832, the Henty brothers sold the farm to the Colonial Secretary, Peter Broun who re-named the homestead Bassendean.

Over the years the Bassendean property became incorporated into the suburb of West Guildford and in 1922, West Guildford was renamed Bassendean. Flooding in 1929 caused severe damage, especially to the primary school oval.

In December 1934, Bassendean Road Board held a referendum, seeking approval to borrow funds for the improvement of an area, known as Hays Swamp, on the edge of the townsite. The development would include a bowling green with floodlights, a croquet lawn, Bassendean Oval, tennis courts and provisions for other sports.

Rail heritage
Bassendean is home to the Western Australian Rail Transport Museum which opened in 1974. The display has a collection of steam and diesel locomotives, some of which have been restored to operating conditions. Also as part of the collection are a number of carriages and other equipment associated including the Zanthus station and a signal box from Perth station. The West Australian Model Railway Club is also housed within the complex. The display's centrepiece is a working scale model featuring engine characters from the children's series Thomas the Tank Engine and Friends.

Facilities
Cyril Jackson Senior High School was built in 1962, and was converted into Cyril Jackson Senior Campus in 1990 to provide specialised study for post high school students gaining entrance into university study. Bassendean railway station is served by Transperth Midland line services.

Industry
Bassendean has had an involvement in railway rolling stock construction and maintenance since Commonwealth Engineering opened a plant in 1951. It closed in the 1980s, with Goninan later taking it over.

Notable people
 Peter Broun (1797–1846), first Colonial Secretary of Western Australia
 Margaret Forrest (1844–1929), wife of Premier John Forrest
 Pat Giles (1928–2017), ALP Senator during the Hawke and Keating governments
 Deborah Vernon Hackett (1887–1965), mining company director and philanthropist
 Rolf Harris (1930-) Australian-British entertainer who grew up in Bassendean and was known as "The Boy from Bassendean"
 James Henty (1800–1882), pioneer British colonist of the area
 May Holman (1893–1939), politician, the first woman Australian Labor Party parliamentarian
 Adem K, musician of the band Turnstyle has lived in Bassendean since 2001
 Jon Stockman, musician from Karnivool lives in Bassendean

See also
 Town of Bassendean

References

Further reading
 Carter, Jennie.Bassendean : a social history 1829–1979 Perth, W.A : Town of Bassendean, 1986.

External links

 Town of Bassendean Website
 Cyril Jackson Senior Campus Website

 
Suburbs of Perth, Western Australia
Town of Bassendean